Tom McGillvray is an American politician and a Republican member of the Montana Senate.  He was a member of the Montana House of Representatives from 2005 to 2013, where he represented House District 50. He currently represents the Billings, Montana, area. He served as House Majority Leader in 2011 legislative session, Assistant Republican leader in the 2009 legislative session and as Majority Whip during the 2007 legislative session.

McGillvray served as Chairman of the Republican Legislative Campaign Committee from 2005 to 2009 and as Vice Chairman from 2009 to 2011.

Personal life
McGillvray received a Bachelor of Science degree from Montana State University. He served as an Ameriprise Financial advisor from 1990 to 2017 and retired in 2017 to run for the Montana State Senate.

McGillvray and his wife Margaret reside in Billings, Montana, and have three children.

References

Living people
1957 births
Republican Party members of the Montana House of Representatives
Montana State University alumni
Politicians from Billings, Montana
Republican Party Montana state senators